By the arrangements of the Canadian federation, Canada's monarchy operates in Manitoba as the core of the province's Westminster-style parliamentary democracy. As such, the Crown within Manitoba's jurisdiction is referred to as the Crown in Right of Manitoba, His Majesty in Right of Manitoba, or the King in Right of Manitoba. The Constitution Act, 1867, however, leaves many royal duties in Manitoba specifically assigned to the sovereign's viceroy, the Lieutenant Governor of Manitoba, whose direct participation in governance is limited by the conventional stipulations of constitutional monarchy.

Constitutional role

The role of the Crown is both legal and practical; it functions in Manitoba in the same way it does in all of Canada's other provinces, being the centre of a constitutional construct in which the institutions of government acting under the sovereign's authority share the power of the whole. It is thus the foundation of the executive, legislative, and judicial branches of the province's government. The Canadian monarch—since 8 September 2022, King Charles III—is represented and his duties carried out by the Lieutenant Governor of Manitoba, whose direct participation in governance is limited by the conventional stipulations of constitutional monarchy, with most related powers entrusted for exercise by the elected parliamentarians, the ministers of the Crown generally drawn from amongst them, and the judges and justices of the peace. The Crown today primarily functions as a guarantor of continuous and stable governance and a nonpartisan safeguard against the abuse of power. This arrangement began with the granting of Royal Assent to the 1870 Manitoba Act and continued an unbroken line of monarchical government extending back to the early 17th century. However, though Manitoba has a separate government headed by the Queen, as a province, Manitoba is not itself a kingdom.

Government House in Winnipeg is owned by the sovereign only in his capacity as King in Right of Manitoba, and used as an official residence by both the lieutenant governor and the sovereign. Other members of the Canadian Royal Family will reside there when in the province.

Royal associations

Those in the Royal Family perform ceremonial duties when on a tour of the province; the royal persons do not receive any personal income for their service, only the costs associated with the exercise of these obligations are funded by both the Canadian and Manitoba Crowns in their respective councils. Monuments around Manitoba mark some of those visits, while others honour a royal personage or event. Further, Manitoba's monarchical status is illustrated by royal names applied regions, communities, schools, and buildings, many of which may also have a specific history with a member or members of the Royal Family. Associations also exist between the Crown and many private organizations within the province; these may have been founded by a Royal Charter, received a royal prefix, and/or been honoured with the patronage of a member of the Royal Family. Examples include the Court of Queen's Bench of Manitoba, the Royal Manitoba Winter Fair, which is under the patronage of Queen Elizabeth II, and the Royal Lake of the Woods Yacht Club, which received its royal prefix from King George V in 1924. At the various levels of education within Alberta, there also exist a number of scholarships and academic awards either established by or named for royal persons.

The main symbol of the monarchy is the sovereign himself, his image (in portrait or effigy) thus being used to signify government authority. A royal cypher or crown may also illustrate the monarchy as the locus of authority, without referring to any specific monarch. Additionally, though the monarch does not form a part of the constitutions of Manitoba's honours, they do stem from the Crown as the fount of honour, and so bear on the insignia symbols of the sovereign.

History

Princess Anne and her elder brother, Prince Charles, Prince of Wales, presided over the celebrations of the centennial of Manitoba's entry into Confederation in 1970.

In 2022, Manitoba instituted a provincial Platinum Jubilee medal to mark the Queen's seventy years on the Canadian throne; the first time in Canada's history that a royal occasion was commemorated on provincial medals.

See also
 Symbols of Manitoba
 Monarchy in Canada

References

External links
 
 Manitobans who share Queen Elizabeth's birthday celebrate at tea at CBC
 As Queen Elizabeth marks Platinum Jubilee, what does monarchy mean in Manitoba? at CBC

Manitoba, Monarchy in
Politics of Manitoba